Pușcași is a commune in Vaslui County, Western Moldavia, Romania. It is composed of four villages: Poiana lui Alexa, Pușcași, Teișoru and Valea Târgului. These were part of Laza Commune until 2004, when they were split off.

References

Communes in Vaslui County
Localities in Western Moldavia